K. J. Ray Liu (born February 11, 1961, Taiwan) is an American scientist, engineer, educator, and entrepreneur. He is the founder, former Chief Executive Officer, and now Chairman and Chief Technology Officer of Origin Wireless, Inc., which pioneers artificial intelligence analytics for wireless sensing and indoor tracking.

Liu served as the 2022 Institute of Electrical and Electronics Engineers (IEEE) president and CEO (2021 president-elect; 2023 past president) with the "Make IEEE Your Professional Home" motto for his IEEE presidency.

He was a Distinguished University Professor, Distinguished Scholar-Teacher, and the Christine Kim Eminent Professor of Information Technology at the University of Maryland, College Park, from where he retired in 2021 after over three decades in academia. His research contributions encompass broad aspects of information and communications technology, with over 800 refereed papers, 70 patents, and 10 books.

He was also the founder and president of Odyssey Technology in 1997-1999, which developed the world's first digital surveillance system through the Internet.

Early life
Liu grew up in Taichung, Taiwan, where he attended St. Viator Catholic Junior High School  and Taichung First Senior High School. He then went on to National Taiwan University, graduating in 1983 with a bachelor's degree in electrical engineering. After serving two years in mandatory military services, Liu earned a master's degree from the University of Michigan, Ann Arbor, in 1987, before receiving Ph.D. degree at the University of California, Los Angeles in 1990.

Career
Liu joined University of Maryland, College Park, in 1990, where he was a Distinguished University Professor and a Distinguished Scholar-Teacher and also Christine Kim Eminent Professor of Information Technology at Electrical and Computer Engineering Department of A. James Clark School of Engineering. He has trained over 70 Ph.D. and postdoctoral students, of which 10 are now IEEE fellows, including Wade Trappe, Zhen Jane Wang, Zhu Han and Haitao Zheng. He retired from the University of Maryland at the end of 2021.

Liu founded Origin Wireless in 2013. His inventions won three prestigious CES Innovation Awards, including CES Best of Innovation in 2021, 2017 CEATEC Grand Prix, 2021 Red Dot Design Award, and many other awards. Origin's first product, marketed as the Belkin Linksys Aware, was deployed in 2019 to over 150 countries worldwide as the first-ever Mesh Wi-Fi integrated communications and motion-sensing technology, marking the birth of integrated communications and sensing for mass consumer applications, and it won many prestigious awards. Verizon Fios launched Home Awareness and Signify, formerly known as Philips Lighting, did SpaceSense in 2022 enabled by Origin's wireless AI technology.

Liu was the 2022 IEEE President and CEO. He strived to "Make IEEE Your Professional Home", a motto that defines his IEEE Presidency. He has served as the 2019 IEEE Vice President - Technical Activities, Division IX Director of IEEE Board of Directors in 2016-17, and the President of IEEE Signal Processing Society in 2012-13. He was also the Editor-in-Chief of IEEE Signal Processing Magazine in 2003-05. Liu was a founder of Asia-Pacific Association of Signal and Information Processing (APSIPA).

As the founder and president of Odyssey Technology in 1997-1999, Liu and his team developed the world's first digital surveillance system through the Internet when the only available surveillance systems were analog. The system was immediately adopted worldwide and used by many major chain stores/banks.

Awards and Honors
Liu is the recipient of two IEEE Technical Field Awards: the 2021 IEEE Fourier Award for Signal Processing with the citation "For outstanding leadership in and pioneering contributions to signal processing for wireless sensing and communications", and the 2016 IEEE Leon K. Kirchmayer Graduate Teaching Award "for exemplary teaching and curriculum development, inspirational mentoring of graduate students, and broad educational impact in signal processing and communications".

Recognized by Web of Science as a Highly Cited Researcher (2001-2014, 2016–17), Liu is a fellow of the IEEE, American Association for the Advancement of Science, and National Academy of Inventors. He was honored as 2021 Distinguished Alumni of National Taiwan University. His research was featured as one of seven technologies that IEEE believes will have the world changing implications on the way humans interact with machines, the world and each other, in honor of IEEE's 125th Anniversary.

He is also the recipient of numerous honors and awards including, IEEE Signal Processing Society 2014 Norbert Wiener Society Award for "influential technical contributions and profound leadership impact" (the highest award bestowed by SPS); IEEE Signal Processing Society 2009 Claude Shannon-Harry Nyquist Technical Achievement Award "for pioneering and outstanding contributions for the advances of signal processing in multimedia forensics, security, and wireless communications"; APSIPA 2018 Grand Award; 1994 National Science Foundation Young Investigator Award; IEEE Signal Processing Society Distinguished Lecturer; IEEE Signal Processing Society Meritorious Service Award; EURASIP Meritorious Service Award, and over a dozen of best paper/invention awards. He was inducted into the IEEE Technical Activities Board Hall of Honors in 2021 "for starting the financial transparency movement, initializing and realizing of IEEE DataPort and IEEE App".

He also received various research and teaching recognitions from the University of Maryland, including Poole and Kent Senior Faculty Teaching Award (2005), Outstanding Faculty Research Award (2008), and Outstanding Service Award (2012), all from A. James Clark School of Engineering; Invention of the Year Award (three times) from the University's Office of Technology Commercialization, as well as the George Corcoran Award for outstanding contributions to electrical engineering education from the Electrical and Computer Engineering Department, and the Outstanding Systems Engineering Faculty Award in recognition of outstanding contributions in interdisciplinary research from Institute for Systems Research.

Contributions and Impact 
Liu's research contributions encompass broad aspects of signal processing and communications, including wireless communications; coding; networking; game theory; multimedia signal processing; information forensics; network security; and signal processing algorithms and architectures. In the recent decade, his focus has been on the development of AI analytics for wireless sensing and indoor tracking using ambient radio signals.

Time-reversal (TR) physics has been known for a long time but mostly found development in research labs and applications in defense-related military applications. Liu was the first to bring time-reversal to the practice and use of our daily life by leveraging radio-frequency multipaths in indoor or multipath-rich environments and prove that it can work effectively. Using the time-reversal principle, he developed the world’s first centimeter-accuracy indoor positioning and tracking system in 2015 with only a single transmitter and terminal device, both with a single antenna, in a completely non-line-of-site environment. It represented the first non-line-of-sight, non-triangulation technique for accurate position estimation, solving a long-standing conundrum of indoor positioning/tracking for over many decades.

He further showed that when there is a large enough number of multipath signals (such as indoor environments), the time-reversal focusing spot exhibits a stationary behavior in its energy distribution. Specifically, in the limit of large time-resolved multipath signals, the time-reversal spot has a spatially independent structure that follows a Bessel function power distribution. This means that the time-reversal spot structure is inherently location and environment-independent. Thus, the distance an object has moved, as well as its speed, can be determined. This is an unprecedented discovery in that one can now accurately/reliably estimate/detect the speed of a moving object indoors without line-of-sight; the more multipaths, the better the performance, contrary to prior beliefs. It was a groundbreaking discovery that broke the impasse of the almost two-century long quest for some new physics that could rival the Doppler Effect. Not only did it enable accurate tracking of an unlimited number of subjects, indoors, and without costly infrastructure or a priori measurements, it also served as the theoretical foundation for accurate/reliable wireless sensing by simply using ambient radio waves, including Wi-Fi.

With that, Liu and his team at Origin developed an AI platform including many analytic engines with endless applications such as indoor tracking; gait determination; motion detection for security; sleep monitoring; monitoring small motions inside a car; material sensing; monitoring heart rate and breathing; heart rate variability detection; fall detection;
recognizing and counting people in hidden spaces; millimeter-wave imaging; millimeter-wave real-time handwriting tracking and analysis; millimeter-wave keyboard tracking; and sound detection.

Liu trailblazed the frontier of wireless sensing that makes sense of ambient Wi-Fi radio waves as the new sixth sense to decipher the world around us! The term "wireless" is no longer restricted to communications. Now and in the future, it is a sensing solution that will forever change Wi-Fi as we know it today, as well as future 5G/6G systems. Through his entrepreneurial endeavor, a new industry is emerging. In essence, one can now make sense of and monetize Channel State Information (sort of the Fourier transform of Channel Impulse Response), an unthinkable concept before. From now on, wireless sensing is becoming an integrated part of the technology infrastructure, especially for 5G/6G when bandwidth is large enough to harness more multipaths and most IoT devices are connected to deliver smart home/office/city. He was the first who proposed in 2019 the establishment of an international standard on wireless sensing to the Chair of the IEEE 802 Standard Committee, who facilitated the creation of 802.11bf WLAN Sensing as the world's first wireless sensing standard.

As the pioneer of digital video surveillance in 1997, his vision brought the digital revolution into the surveillance industry, leading to where we are today. Its product, "Remoteeyes", was the world's first digital video surveillance system to monitor and secure home/office through the Internet remotely. The impact is everlasting with the ubiquitous use of cameras for surveillance over the Internet nowadays with a $50 billion market.

Liu also pioneered cross-layer design using antenna arrays for wireless communications in 1997 by first introducing the seminal concept of duality between uplink and downlink for joint transmit beamforming and power control to increase the number of users in a cellular network by 100x.
It inspired decades of research and standard development in cross-layer optimization of MIMO wireless networks, dramatically impacting most wireless communications system designs.

In addition, he was among the earliest to recognize and significantly impact cooperative communications beyond physical-layer. He showed the endless possibilities of cooperation in a series of seminal works to establish cooperation as a communication paradigm that can improve communication performance, expand transmission coverage area; improve energy efficiency and extend network lifetime; and increase throughput and stability region for multiple access schemes.

Liu was among the first to employ game theory to devise optimal solutions and strategies in cognitive radio for dynamic spectrum access, allocation, sharing, sensing, security, and anti-jamming. His pioneering works created the game-theoretic foundation for cognitive networking by developing new framework of joint learning and decision making such as Chinese Restaurant Games. It enabled true cognitive intelligence and adaptation with user interactions, making the dream of cognitive networking possible.

He was also one of the earliest pioneers in multimedia forensics and security. In his 2005 book, "multimedia fingerprinting forensics for traitor tracing", the first of its kind, he has set the foundation and offered new directions for this emerging field. He coined the name “information forensics” when proposing and developing the journal IEEE Transactions on Information Forensics and Security.

Liu was the prime architect and proposer of IEEE Trans. on Information Forensics and Security, IEEE Journal on Selected Topics of Signal Processing, and IEEE Trans. on Multimedia. He also initiated the creation of IEEE Trans. on Computational Imaging and IEEE Trans. on Signal and Information Processing over Networks. As Vice President – Publications, he started the Inside Signal Processing eNewsletter for IEEE Signal Processing Society.

As a leader in IEEE, Liu was credited for starting the financial transparency movement, leading to the next-generation financial system at IEEE. He proposed and created the IEEE DataPort to offer data repository services to support open science and reproducible research by hosting data that are citable and useful for our community. He also proposed and co-led the development of the IEEE App that serves as "Your Global Gateway to IEEE" to discover IEEE and network globally.

Publications and Patents 
Liu has published over 800 refereed papers, 70 patents, and 10 books, including the following:
 "Reciprocity, Evolution, and Decision Games in Network and Data Science", Cambridge University Press, 2021
 "Wireless AI: Wireless Sensing, Positioning, IoT, and Communications", Cambridge University Press, 2019
 "Behavior Dynamics in Media-Sharing Social Networks", Cambridge University Press, 2011
 "Cognitive Radio Networking and Security – A Game Theoretic View", Cambridge University Press, 2010
 "Cooperative Communications and Networking", Cambridge University Press, 2009
 "Resource Allocation for Wireless Networks: Basics, Techniques, and Applications", Cambridge University Press, 2008 
 "Ultra-Wideband Communication Systems: The Multiband OFDM Approach", Wiley, 2007 
 "Network-Aware Security for Group Communications", Springer, 2007 
 "Multimedia Fingerprinting Forensics for Traitor Tracing", Hindawi, 2005 
 "Design of Digital Video Coding Systems: A Complete Compressed Domain Approach", Marcel Dekker, 2001 
 "Handbook on Array Processing and Sensor Networks", Ed., IEEE-Wiley, 2009

References

1961 births
Living people
Taiwanese electrical engineers
National Taiwan University alumni
University of California, Los Angeles alumni
University of Michigan alumni
University of Maryland, College Park faculty
Taiwanese expatriates in the United States
Fellows of the National Academy of Inventors
Fellow Members of the IEEE
Fellows of the American Association for the Advancement of Science
Academic journal editors